American Flyer may refer to:

 American Flyer, a brand of toy train and model railroad
 American Flyer (band), an American rock group
 Western Flyer (bicycle), an American bicycle sold by Western Auto
 American Flyer (railcar), a lightweight passenger car
 An early name for the Acela Express

American Flyers may refer to:

 American Flyers, a 1985 film starring Kevin Costner
 American Flyers Airline, a U.S. airline that operated from 1949 to 1971
 American Flyers (Lake Compounce), a ride at Lake Compounce amusement park in Connecticut